Bornella anguilla is a species of sea slug, a nudibranch, a marine gastropod mollusk in the family Bornellidae.
This species is widely distributed throughout the tropical waters of the Indo-West Pacific.

This species can grow up to a length of 8 cm.

References

External links 

 
 

Bornellidae
Gastropods described in 1984